Christopher Joseph Elvidge (4 April 1892 – date of death unknown) was an English professional footballer who played as an inside left. He made appearances in the English Football League for Wrexham, playing in their first season as part of the English Football League.

He also played for Hereford Town and Shrewsbury Town outside of the English Football League.

References

1892 births
Date of death unknown
English footballers
Association football forwards
English Football League players
Hereford Town F.C. players
Wrexham A.F.C. players
Shrewsbury Town F.C. players